Acacia comans is a shrub of the genus Acacia and the subgenus Plurinerves that is native to an area along the west coast of western Australia.

Description
Like most species of Acacia it has phyllodes rather than true leaves. It blooms from June to September and produces yellow flowers.

Taxonomy
The species was first formally described by the botanist William Vincent Fitzgerald in 1904 as part of the work Additions to the West Australian Flora as published in the Journal of the West Australian Natural History Society. It was reclassified as Racosperma comans by Leslie Pedley in 2003 then transferred back to genus Acacia in 2006.

Distribution
It is native to an area in the Mid West region of Western Australia where it is commonly situated on sandplains growing in sandy soils. The shrubs range extends from around Geraldton in the north to around Coorow in the south.

See also
List of Acacia species

References

comans
Acacias of Western Australia
Taxa named by William Vincent Fitzgerald
Plants described in 1904